Thau is a surname.

Origins
As an Ashkenazi Jewish surname, Thau originated either from the German word  meaning "dew", from the name of the letter tav in the Hebrew script, or from some personal name which started with that letter.

Tháu is also a Gan romanization of two Chinese surnames: Cao and Tao.

Statistics
As of 2019, there were 71 people in Denmark with the surname Thau.

In the Netherlands, there were zero people with the surname Thau as of 2007, down from four in 1947.

The 2010 United States Census found 457 people with the surname Thau, making it the 46,568th-most-common name in the country. This represented a decrease from 466 (43,629th-most-common) in the 2000 Census. In the 2010 census, about eight-tenths of the bearers of the surname identified as White, and 13 percent as Asian.

People
Martin Thau (1887–1979), Danish gymnast
Benny Thau (1898–1983). American film industry businessman
Leon Thau (1926–2010), British actor
Eveline Goodman-Thau (born 1934), first female rabbi in Austria
Marty Thau (1938–2014), American music producer
Zvi Thau (born 1939), Israeli rabbi
Lea Thau (born 1971), American film director

References

Chinese-language surnames
Jewish surnames